A discalced congregation is a religious congregation that goes barefoot or wears sandals. These congregations are often distinguished on this account from other branches of the same order. The custom of going unshod was introduced into the West by St Francis of Assisi for men and by St Clare of Assisi for women.

The word is derived from the Latin discalceātus, from dis (apart, away) + calceātus (shod), from calceāre (to provide with shoes), from calceus (shoe), from calx (heel).

Discalceation
Discalceation means "removal of footwear".  St. Teresa of Ávila was one of a number of saints of the Roman Catholic Church who were "discalced" or shoeless. She and St. John of the Cross were the founders of the Discalced Carmelites.

The origins of discalceation lie in Exodus 3:5, where God tells Moses "Take off your sandals, for the place where you are standing is holy ground". 

A separate custom in Biblical times of taking off only one shoe as part of a socially witnessed contract is referred to in Ruth 4:7 and Deuteronomy 25:9.

History
After the various modifications of the Rule of Saint Francis, the Observants (who existed as an independent branch of the Franciscan Order before 1897) adhered to the custom of going unshod. The Minim friars and Capuchins followed in this practice. The Discalced Franciscans of Spain (known as Alcantarines, who formed a distinct branch of the Franciscan Order before 1897) went without footwear of any kind. The followers of St. Clare of Assisi at first went barefoot, but later came to wear sandals and shoes.

The Colettine and Capuchin nuns returned to the use of sandals. Sandals were also adopted by the Camaldolese monks of the Congregation of Monte Corona (1522), the Maronite Catholic monks, the Poor Hermits of St. Jerome of the Congregation of Blessed Peter of Pisa, the Augustinians of Thomas of Jesus (1532), the Barefooted Servites (1593), the Discalced Carmelites (1568), the Feuillants (Cistercians, 1575), the Trinitarians (1594), the Discalced Mercedarians (1604), and the Passionists.

References

External links
Discalced at Catholic Encyclopedia
Discalced Carmelite
Teresa of Ávila
"Discalced" at Catholic Encyclopedia

Catholic theology and doctrine
Catholic terminology
Discalced Carmelite Order